Global Mechanic Media is an interdisciplinary creative studio headquartered in Vancouver, British Columbia, Canada.  It is known for creating various digital and traditional media, feature and short films, television series, commercials, games, installations, interactive experiences, titles, and original photography using many different techniques. Global Mechanic was founded in 2000 by Creative Director, Bruce Alcock and is currently owned with his wife, CEO Tina Ouellette. Specialties include animation, branding and design.

Notable works
 Birdgirl (season 2)
 Phred on Your Head Show
 Dirty Singles
 A Sweet Story
 Sir Bit
 All Terrain Brain
 Avery Matthews
 The Brothers Pistov
 Dumb Ways to Die
 FETCH! with Ruff Ruffman
 Harvey Birdman, Attorney at Law
 Spang Ho
 I Am Poem! (intro)
 Wrong Number Phone Message
 Vive la rose
 At the Quinte Hotel
 Plum Landing

Commercials
Rachis "Opening Wine" (2013)
Smirnoff Rocket Scientist", "Rocket", "Smirnoff BBQ", "Smirnoff Cottage" (2012)
OLG "Play OLG" (2012)
The Globe and Mail "More Life" (2011)
VANOC Connections", "Richmond Oval", "Sustainability", "Athletes Village" (2010)
The Bay "Threads", "Making Of" 
Silk "Banana", "Boobs", "Brain", "Carrots", "Gum", "Penny", "Rice", "Shaving", "Spiders", "Turkey" 
BC Hydro "Powersmart" 
Plan Canada "Because I am a Girl" 
Nokia "Fits You", "Making Of" 
Coca-Cola "Character", "Bubbles", "Coke Geniuser", "Friends", "Coke Summer", "Yebo", "Language", "Radio"  
Holland America Line "You? Dancing?" (2004)
Chili's "Postcards" (2002)
Noggin "Nickelodeon Block Open" (2000)
Noggin "One & Only" (1999)
Phred on Your Head Show (opening) (1999)
Kraft Foods "Rocket Science/No-Brainer" (1998)
Animal Planet "Holiday ID's" (1998)
Locomotion "Galactica" (1998)
Reese's Puffs "Dragon" (1997)
Coca-Cola "Friends" (1997)
Cartoon Network "Blocks/Soup" (1996)
Coca-Cola "Hangin' Out" (1996)
Nickelodeon "Snick Snack" (1995)

References

External links
Official site

Canadian companies established in 2000
Companies based in Vancouver
Canadian animation studios
Mass media companies established in 2000